Statistics of Swedish football Division 1 in season 1995.

Overview
It was contested by 28 teams, and Umeå FC and IK Oddevold won the championship.

League standings

Norra

Södra

Footnotes

References
Sweden - List of final tables (Clas Glenning)

1995
2
Sweden
Sweden